The Weizmann Institute of Science ( Machon Vaitzman LeMada) is a public research university in Rehovot, Israel, established in 1934, 14 years before the State of Israel. It differs from other Israeli universities in that it offers only postgraduate degrees in the natural and exact sciences.

It is a multidisciplinary research center, with around 3,800 scientists, postdoctoral fellows, Ph.D. and M.Sc. students, and scientific, technical, and administrative staff working at the institute.

As of 2019, six Nobel laureates and three Turing Award winners have been associated with the Weizmann Institute of Science.

History

Founded in 1934 by Chaim Weizmann and his first team, among them Benjamin M. Bloch, as the Daniel Sieff Research Institute. Weizmann had offered the post of director to Nobel Prize laureate Fritz Haber, but took over the directorship himself after Haber's death en route to Palestine. Before he became President of the State of Israel in February 1949, Weizmann pursued his research in organic chemistry at its laboratories. The institute was renamed the Weizmann Institute of Science in his honor on November 2, 1949, in agreement with the Sieff family.

WEIZAC, one of the world's first electronic computers was locally built by the institute in 1954–1955 and was recognized by the IEEE in 2006 as a milestone achievement in the history of electrical and electronic engineering.

In 1959, the institute set up a wholly owned subsidiary called Yeda Research and Development Company to commercialize inventions made at the institute. Yeda has more marine genetic patents than any other research institute. By 2013 the institute was earning between $50 and $100 million in royalties annually on marketed drugs including Copaxone, Rebif, and Erbitux.

Graduate program
The Weizmann Institute presently has about 2,500 students, postdoctoral fellows, staff, and faculty, and awards M.Sc. and Ph.D. degrees in mathematics, computer science, physics, chemistry, biochemistry, and biology, as well as several interdisciplinary programs. The symbol of the Weizmann Institute of Science is the multibranched Ficus tree. Undergraduates and recent graduates must apply to M.Sc. programs, while those earning an M.Sc. or an MD can apply directly to Ph.D. programs. Full fellowships are given to all students.

Youth programs

In addition to its academic programs, the Weizmann Institute runs programs for youth, including science clubs, camps, and competitions. The Bessie F. Lawrence International Summer Science Institute accepts high-school graduates from all over the world for a four-week, science-based summer camp.  The Clore Garden of Science, which opened in 1999, is the world's first completely interactive outdoor science museum.

Rankings
The Weizmann Institute of Science was ranked number 2, globally, for research quality by the Nature Index in 2019, and in the top 25 research institutes/universities in the world in two main categories by U-Multirank, 2019: Top Cited Publications and Patents Awarded. The institute was in 7th place in the European Research Council report in 2020 for its high rate of success in obtaining research grants.
In 2018 the institute was ranked 9th, globally, (1st in Israel) by the CWTS Leiden Ranking, which is based on the proportion of a university's scientific papers published between 2012 and 2015 that made the 10% most cited in their field.

Presidents

The nonscientists Abba Eban and Meyer Weisgal were assisted by scientific directors, as was Weizmann himself owing to his duties as the first president of Israel. The following persons held the position of scientific director:

Faculty

Alumni

See also
 List of universities in Israel
 Science and technology in Israel

References

External links

 Weizmann Institute of Science Website 

 
Buildings and structures in Rehovot
Educational institutions established in 1934
Multidisciplinary research institutes
Postgraduate schools
Research institutes in Israel
Technical universities and colleges in Israel
1934 establishments in Mandatory Palestine